Benjamin Baker may refer to:

Benjamin Baker (engineer) (1840–1907), English engineer
Benjamin F. Baker (1862–1927), U.S. Navy sailor and Medal of Honor recipient
Benjamin Franklin Baker (musician) (1811–1889), American educator and composer
B. Frank Baker (1864–1939), American businessman and politician
Benjamin Howard Baker (1892–1987), English athlete
Ben Baker (photographer), portrait photographer
Ben Baker (politician), member of the Missouri House of Representatives

See also